Marc Recasens Llobet (born 13 September 1999) is a Spanish field hockey player who plays as a defender for División de Honor club Club Egara and the Spain national team.

International career
Recasens made his debut for the senior national team in March 2019 in a test match against Chile. On 25 May 2021, he was selected in the squad for the 2021 EuroHockey Championship, his first senior tournament. He competed in the 2020 Summer Olympics. He made his World Cup debut at the 2023 Men's FIH Hockey World Cup.

References

External links

1999 births
Living people
Field hockey players at the 2020 Summer Olympics
Spanish male field hockey players
Olympic field hockey players of Spain
Male field hockey defenders
Club Egara players
División de Honor de Hockey Hierba players
2023 Men's FIH Hockey World Cup players
Field hockey players from Barcelona